The Hyponectriaceae are a family of fungi, that was formerly in the order Xylariales. It was placed in the Amphisphaeriales order in 2020.

Genera
As accepted in 2020 (with amount of genera);

 Apiothyrium  (2)
 Arecomyces  (10)
 Arwidssonia  (2)
 Cesatiella  (3)
 Chamaeascus  (1)

 Discosphaerina  (21)
 Exarmidium  (14)
 Frondicola  (1)
 Hyponectria  (30)
 Lichenoverruculina  (1)
 Micronectria  (4)
 Papilionovela  (1)
 Pellucida  (1)
 Phragmitensis  (2)
 Physalospora  (37)

 Rhachidicola  (1)
 Xenothecium  (1)

References

Amphisphaeriales
Taxa named by Franz Petrak